The Meehan Range is a prominent geographical feature of steep hills running parallel to the River Derwent on Hobart's eastern shore. It is located in the City of Clarence, Tasmania. It is a  protected area, and is often enjoyed for  recreational activities including an expanding network of mountain bike trails.

Environment
As the skyline of the Meehan Range is protected from development, it is covered in native bushland, which makes it prone to bushfire during Australia's hot summers. Much of the range was devastated in the Hobart fires of 1967.

The range forms part of the South-east Tasmania Important Bird Area, identified as such by BirdLife International because of its importance in the conservation of a range of woodland birds, especially the endangered swift parrot and forty-spotted pardalote.

References

Geography of Hobart
Important Bird Areas of Tasmania
City of Clarence